Tutok Tulfo (English: Focus (to) Tulfo) was TV5's first ever investigative news show. Hosted by Erwin Tulfo, it aired every Saturdays on AksyonTV at 7:00 p.m. (PST) and 11:00 p.m. on TV5 (PST). It is not to be confused with Tutok Erwin Tulfo, Tulfo's former radio program that aired on DZRB-AM after his departure from TV5.

History
Tutok Tulfo first aired on TV5 on March 13, 2010, and ended on August 4, 2012. It was hosted by Erwin Tulfo It originally aired at 5:30 p.m. (PST), before being moved to late nights along with Aksyon Weekend to make way for Willing Willie. It had an early telecast every Saturday on AksyonTV at 7:00 p.m. (PST).

On September 2011, the program reformatted to become more documentary-investigative leaning with several topics discussed over multiple weeks. To cater to the new format, Tulfo mostly ventured outside the studio as a pre-taped program with additional man-on-the street interviews.

On December 24, 2021, PTV's management confirmed that Tulfo decided to part ways with the network. He made his final appearance on Ulat Bayan and Tutok Erwin Tulfo on June 27, 2022, and was later replaced by Audrey Gorriceta as the Main Anchor in December 2021 & Maan Macapagal in March 2022.

A officially canceling the program. However, its sister radio program Radyo Pilipinas continued airing until June 27, 2022, when Tulfo left the network and transferred to DSWD Secretary relief anchor Aljo Bendijo filling in the gap. On June 27, 2022, former DZAR anchor Mike Abe took over the timeslot with Mike Abe Live, ending the second run of Tutok Erwin Tulfo.

Host
Erwin Tulfo

See also
List of programs aired by TV5 (Philippine TV network)

External links
 The official show site of Tutok Tulfo
 Tutok Tulfo's official fan page

TV5 (Philippine TV network) original programming
Philippine reality television series
2010 Philippine television series debuts
2012 Philippine television series endings
Filipino-language television shows